Fukasawa (written: 深澤 or 深沢) is a Japanese surname. Notable people with the surname include:

, Japanese composer
, Japanese footballer
, Japanese industrial designer

Japanese-language surnames